The Monterrey Open was a golf tournament on the Buy.com Tour, formerly the Nike Tour, from 1993 to 2001. It was played at the Club Campestre in San Pedro Garza García, a suburb of Monterrey, Mexico.

The purse in 2001 was US$450,000, with $81,000 going to the winner.

Winners

References

Former Korn Ferry Tour events
Golf tournaments in Mexico
Sport in Monterrey
Recurring sporting events established in 1993
Recurring sporting events disestablished in 2001